Youngor Sevelee Telewoda (born September 3, 1952, in Firestone, Margibi County, Liberia) was the Liberian ambassador to Germany, Austria, Japan with Co-Accreditation to Indonesia, the Republic of Korea, Malaysia, Singapore, the Philippines, Thailand and New Zealand from 2011 to 2017. From 2003 to 2010, Telewoda served as Liberia’s Ambassador Extraordinary and Plenipotentiary to Belgium with concurrent accreditation to the Netherlands, Luxembourg and the European Union.

Education
High School Diploma, College of West Africa, Monrovia, Liberia, 1967 – 1970
Bachelor of Business Administration (Management), University of Liberia, Monrovia, Liberia, 1971 – 1974
Master´s degree in Business Administration, Pace University, New York, USA, 1976 – 1979 
Diploma in Project Planning and Budgeting for Rural Development in Third World Countries from the University of Bradford, England, April - July 1982.

References

1952 births
Living people
People from Margibi County
University of Liberia alumni
Pace University alumni
Ambassadors of Liberia to Austria
Liberian women ambassadors
Ambassadors of Liberia to Germany
Ambassadors of Liberia to Japan
Ambassadors of Liberia to Indonesia
Ambassadors of Liberia to South Korea
Ambassadors of Liberia to Malaysia
Ambassadors of Liberia to Singapore
Ambassadors of Liberia to the Philippines
Ambassadors of Liberia to Thailand
Ambassadors of Liberia to New Zealand
Ambassadors of Liberia to Belgium
Ambassadors of Liberia to the European Union
Ambassadors of Liberia to the Netherlands
Ambassadors of Liberia to Luxembourg